n-Propylbenzene is an aromatic hydrocarbon with the formula .  The molecule consists of a propyl group attached to a phenyl ring.  It is a colorless liquid. A more common structural isomer of this compound is cumene. 

n-Propylbenzene is used as a nonpolar organic solvent in various industries, including printing and the dyeing of textiles and in the manufacture of methylstyrene. It can be synthesized by the reaction of the Grignard reagent derived from benzyl chloride with diethyl sulfate.

References 

Alkylbenzenes
C3-Benzenes